Saand Ki Aankh is a 2019 Indian biographical drama film directed by Tushar Hiranandani and produced by Anurag Kashyap, Reliance Entertainment and Nidhi Parmar. The film features Taapsee Pannu, Bhumi Pednekar and Prakash Jha in the lead roles, it also features Pawan Chopra, Kuldeep sareen , Vineet Kumar Singh and Shaad Randhawa in the supporting roles. It is based on the lives of sharpshooters Chandro and Prakashi Tomar. Filming began on 10 February 2019 in Baghpat. Some parts were filmed in Hastinapur and Mawana. It was released on 25 October 2019, coinciding with the Diwali festival.

Cast 
 Bhumi Pednekar as Chandro Tomar
 Taapsee Pannu as Prakashi Tomar
 Prakash Jha as Rattan Singh Tomar
 Kuldeep Sareen as Bhanwan Singh Tomar
 Pawan Chopra as Jai Singh Tomar
 Vineet Kumar Singh as Dr. Yashpal
 Yudhvir Ahlawat as Young Rambir Tomar
 Yogendra Vikram Singh as young Rattan Singh Tomar
 Ronak Bhinder as young Bhanwar Singh Tomar
 Amol Nikhare as Young Jai Singh Tomar
 Navneet Srivastava as Farooq
 Shaad Randhawa as Rambir Tomar
 Pritha Bakshi as Seema Tomar
 Sara Arjun as Shefali Tomar
 Himanshu Sharma as Sachin Tomar
 Kavita Vaid as Bimla Tomar (Prakashi Tomar and Chandro Tomar's sister-in-law)
 Trupti Khamkhar as young Bimla Tomar
 Nikhat Khan as Maharani Mahedra Kumari
 Dinesh Mohan as Maharaja of Alwar

Production

Development and casting 
Initially the film was titled Womaniya with Taapsee Pannu and Bhumi Pednekar in lead roles. But due to controversy over legal rights of the title which is held by Pritish Nandy Communications, the film was renamed as Saand Ki Aankh. Later on Prakash Jha was also included in the cast to play a vital role. In the last week of February 2019, Vineet Kumar Singh was added to the cast. Giving details of the film, the co producer Anurag Kashyap stated that the film is a biopic based on the life of the oldest sharpshooters, Chandro Tomar and her sister-in-law Prakashi Tomar.

Filming 
Filming began on 10 February 2019 in Baghpat. The second part of the film is to be shot in Hastinapur and Mawana. Pannu trained in air pistol and rifle shooting to reprise the role of a sharpshooter in the film. The filming was completed in the last week of April as Pannu shared the news on social media.

Promotion and release

On 14 February 2019, the lead actors shared the first look of the film from location. Giving wishes on Holi festival, Pannu shared another look from the film on Twitter on 21 March 2019. A short video introducing Chandro and Prakashi Tomar, on whose life the film is based was released by Reliance Entertainment on 14 April 2019 on YouTube. First look posters of the film were released on 16 April 2019. In the posters, Pannu and Bhumi are posing with their pistols. The poster gives the release date as Diwali.

The film was theatrically released on 25 October 2019. It was screened as opening film at 51st International Film Festival of India in January 2021 in Indian Panorama section.

Soundtrack

The music of the film is composed by Vishal Mishra, with lyrics written by Raj Shekhar.

Reception

Critical response 

Priyanka Sinha Jha of News18, praising Taapsee Pannu and Bhumi Pednekar for their 'endearing' performances, rates the film with three and half stars out of five. She writes, "What sets apart Saand Ki Aankh is that director Tushar Hiranandani frames the issues of patriarchy and gender discrimination within the structure of a family drama which is heart-wrenching and triumphant in equal measure." Concluding, she opined, that the simple storytelling, with good background score and suitable production design the film has hit the bullseye. Sonal Gera of India TV gave three and half stars out of five and noted that Saand Ki Aankh is a 'compelling feminist statement'. Criticising make-up and prosthetics used on Taapsee and Bhumi she felt that they looked too young to be 60-year-olds. Nevertheless, praising the performance of Pannu, Pednekar and Prakash Jha, she concluded, "The films needs to be watched but for powerful performances by inarguably two of the best actresses of recent times, Prakash Jha's baddie, an inspiring narrative and for the sheer joy of watching a good female-centric movie". Mike McCahill of The Guardian gave two stars out of five and concluded "This feels like a waste of rich narrative possibilities, as mechanically feelgood as those two dozen Britflicks that have cast Dames Dench, Smith et al as old dears who shoot from the lip".

Box office
Saand Ki Aankhs opening day domestic collection was 48 lakhs. On the second day, the film collected 1.08 crore. On the third day, the film collected 91 lakhs, taking total opening weekend collection to 2.47 crore.

, with a gross of 27.86 crore in India and 2.84 crore overseas, the film has a worldwide gross collection of 30.7 crore.

Awards and nominations

References

External links 
 
 
 

2010s Hindi-language films
Films shot in Uttar Pradesh
Reliance Entertainment films
Films about women in India
Films scored by Vishal Mishra
2010s feminist films
Indian biographical drama films
2019 biographical drama films
Indian feminist films
2019 drama films
2019 films